Tom Learoyd-Lahrs (born 13 September 1985 in Tweed Heads, New South Wales) is an Australian former professional rugby league footballer who played in the 2000s and 2010s, he played in the National Rugby League (NRL) competition. A New South Wales State of Origin and Australian international representative forward, he played for the Brisbane Broncos, Canberra Raiders and the Melbourne Storm.

Early life
While educated at Farrer Memorial Agricultural High School, Tamworth. Learoyd-Lahrs represented the 2002 & 2003 Australian Schoolboys.

Playing career
Learoyd-Lahrs made his first grade debut for the Brisbane Broncos against Parramatta in round 2 of the 2004 NRL season at Suncorp Stadium.  In the same year, he played in the club's elimination final against Melbourne.  In the 2005 NRL season, he made only two appearances for Brisbane and then joined Canberra.

Learoyd-Lahrs' first three seasons with Canberra were disrupted by injuries, but in 2009 he discovered his best form and began a series of impressive displays that led to his selection on the bench for NSW in Game 3 of the State of Origin series after being the 18th man for Game 2.

Despite playing in the second row Learoyd-Lahrs also covered the front row. Luke Bailey once commented that "Learoyd-Lahrs is about 600 kilos". He typically played an "enforcer" type role similar to the role played by Anthony Watmough and Neville Costigan.

Learoyd-Lahrs was eligible to play for the Indigenous DreamTime team.

He represented Australia in the 2010 Four Nations tournament.  He made 109 appearances for Canberra and featured in the club's 2010 and 2012 finals campaigns.

Learoyd-Lahrs signed on with the Melbourne Storm for the 2015 NRL season. He made his Melbourne Storm debut in round 2 against Manly-Warringah. Following the season, he announced his retirement due to ongoing injury.

After retiring from the NRL, he played one last season for North Tamworth Bears in the Group 4 Rugby League competition in 2016, winning the premiership with them.

For the 2022 TDRL (Townsville & Districts Rugby league) season Tom plays for the Norths Devils.

References

External links

Tom Learoyd-Lahrs at Raiders.com.au

1985 births
Living people
Australia national rugby league team players
Australian people of German descent
Australian rugby league players
Brisbane Broncos players
Canberra Raiders players
Country New South Wales Origin rugby league team players
Indigenous All Stars players
Indigenous Australian rugby league players
Melbourne Storm players
Mount Pritchard Mounties players
New South Wales Rugby League State of Origin players
Prime Minister's XIII players
Rugby league players from Tweed Heads, New South Wales
Rugby league props
Rugby league second-rows
Sunshine Coast Falcons players